Karl Albert Schleunes (April 21, 1937 – May 15, 2021) was an American historian of the Holocaust and the German Empire. He was a professor at the University of North Carolina at Greensboro (UNCG). 
Schleunes obtained his Bachelor in 1959 at Lakeland College (Wisconsin), and his Master's at the University of Minnesota in 1961, where he also received his Ph.D. in 1966. From 1965 to 1971 he taught at the University of Illinois at Chicago. Since then he was at the UNCG. In 1999 he was a 
guest lecturer at the Kaplan Centre of the University of Cape Town.

Karl Schleunes was born in Kiel, Wisconsin the son of Henry Schleunes (1892–1968) and Adelia Eickoff (1896–1984) of Schleswig. In August 1964, he married Brenda Jean Pursel, founder and artistic director of the Touring Theatre of North Carolina.

In the 1960s, along with a handful of European and American scholars, Karl helped establish a new field in modern historical studies. His ground-breaking research in the Berlin Document Center which holds materials captured from the Germans, provided him with evidence to produce an exhaustive analysis of the policies which led to the murders of six million Jews.

Schleunes worked on a book project that looks at the same problems as The Twisted Road to Auschwitz but is drawn from the fifty years of information garnered since the launching of his book published a half century ago and, in fact, still in print. As Karl said, “I learned a lot in fifty years; the book didn’t learn anything.”

Karl will be remembered for his many years of workshops sponsored by the NC Council on the Holocaust Teacher Workshops teachers across the state and as the honoree of the Schleunes Lectures which annually bring a well-known Holocaust scholar to speak at Greensboro College, an event sponsored by Richard and Jane Levy.

Publications
 The Twisted Road to Auschwitz, Nazi Policy Toward German Jews, 1933-1939; UIP 1970.
 Schooling and Society; The Politics of Education in Prussia and Bavaria, 1750-1900; 1989. 
 Legislating the Holocaust; The Bernhard Loesener Memoirs.

Notes 

1937 births
Historians of Nazism
Historians of the Holocaust
21st-century American historians
21st-century American male writers
20th-century American historians
American male non-fiction writers
2021 deaths
People from Kiel, Wisconsin
Historians from Wisconsin
University of Illinois Urbana-Champaign faculty
Lakeland College (Wisconsin) alumni
University of Minnesota alumni
20th-century American male writers